Statistics of Swedish football Division 3 for the 1970 season.

League standings

Norra Norrland, Övre 1970

Norra Norrland, Nedre 1970

Södra Norrland, Övre 1970

Södra Norrland, Nedre 1970

Norra Svealand 1970

Östra Svealand 1970

Västra Svealand 1970

Nordöstra Götaland 1970

Nordvästra Götaland 1970

Mellersta Götaland 1970

Sydöstra Götaland 1970

Sydvästra Götaland 1970

Skåne 1970

Footnotes

References 

Swedish Football Division 3 seasons